Carissa Shiwen Yip (born September 10, 2003) is an American chess player and a former U.S. Women's Chess Champion. In September 2019, she was the top rated female player in the United States and the youngest female chess player to defeat a grandmaster, which she did at age ten. In October 2019, she became the youngest American woman in history to qualify for the title of International Master.

Early life and chess career
Carissa Shiwen Yip was born on September 10, 2003, in Boston. Her father Percy Yip (Pinyin: Yè Péizhào) was from Hong Kong, and her mother Irene Yip (née Cheng, ; Pinyin: Chéng Huálín) was from mainland China.

Taught chess moves at age six by her father, within six months she was able to beat him. Soon, she became the best eight-year-old girl chess player in the country. In 2013, at the age of ten, she became the youngest female player to qualify for the USCF title of Expert (rating >2000) in history, and in 2015, at eleven years old, she became the youngest female national master.

In June 2014, at the age of 10, she became the youngest ever club champion of the Wachusett Chess Club in Fitchburg, MA with a 7-0 score.

Her first victory against a grandmaster came on August 30, 2014, when she defeated Alexander Ivanov at the New England Open. At ten years of age, she was the youngest female chess player ever to beat a grandmaster.

Yip competed in the U.S. Women's Chess Championship for the first time in 2016; she finished 9th out of 12, scoring 4½ points out of 11. In 2017, she scored 4/11, finishing 11th. In 2019, she finished 8th, with a score of 4½/11. In June 2018, Yip earned her final Woman International Master (WIM) norm, first Woman Grandmaster (WGM) norm, and first International Master (IM) norm by winning clear first place in the Charlotte Chess Center's Summer 2018 IM Norm Invitational held in Charlotte, North Carolina with an undefeated score of 7.0/9. In July 2018, she became the 2018 U.S. Junior Girls' Champion with a score of 7/9, as well as the 2018 World Open Women's Champion. In late June 2019, she won the North American Junior Girls' Championship, held in Charlotte, North Carolina, with a score of 8½/9, earning the FIDE title of Woman Grandmaster in the process. She subsequently scored 7½/9 to win the 2019 U.S. Junior Girls' Championship, earning an invitation to the 2020 U.S. Women's Championship. In 2020, Yip repeated as U.S. Junior Girls' Champion, again with a 7½/9 score, and placed second in the U.S. Women's Chess Championship with a score of 8/11, a ½-point behind Irina Krush.

Her performance at the 2019 SPICE Cup, where she scored 5/9, made her the youngest American woman to earn the title of International Master. FIDE awarded her the title in February 2020.

In 2021, Yip competed at the FIDE Women's World Cup, a 103-player single-elimination tournament that took place in Sochi, Russia. She was seeded 28th coming into the tournament and defeated players Sharmin Sultana Shirin and Nataliya Buksa before being eliminated by Nana Dzagnidze in Round 3. Yip won the 2021 U.S. Women's Championship in St. Louis, scoring 8½/11—1½ points ahead of second place—and defeated four former Women's champions in the tournament, those four being Irina Krush, Anna Zatonskih, Nazí Paikidze, and Sabina Foisor. This made her the first woman to defeat four former U.S. Women’s champions in a U.S. Women's Championship.

FIDE ratings

Notable games 

Carissa Shiwen Yip vs Alexander Vladimirovich Ivanov. Modern Defense: Standard Line (B06) 1-0. Ignoring a pin on the b-file, Yip earns her first win against a Grandmaster.
Carissa Shiwen Yip vs Irina Krush, 2016 US Chess Championship (Women). Sicilian Defense: Kan. Yip defeats a six-time US Women's Champion. The final position contains a problem-like move.

Education
Yip graduated from Phillips Academy in 2022 and then attended Stanford University.

Television game show appearance
Yip and former chess opponent Irina Krush appeared on a special primetime episode of The Price Is Right that aired on January 18, 2023.  Yip never got out of Contestant's Row while Krush won a pricing game.

Notes

References

External links
 
 
 Carissa Yip Wins US Girls' Junior Championship at YouTube
 Carissa Yip Defeats Women's World Champion at YouTube

2003 births
Living people
American female chess players
American people of Chinese descent
American people of Hong Kong descent
Chess International Masters
Chess woman grandmasters
Sportspeople from Boston
21st-century American women